Pieter Jan "Piet Jan" van der Giessen (1 January 1918 – 10 June 1993) was a sailor from the Netherlands, who represented his native country as  at the 1952 Summer Olympics in Helsinki. Piet Jan, as crew member on the Dutch 5.5 Metre De Ruyter, took the 13th place with helmsman Wim de Vries Lentsch and fellow crew member Flip Keegstra.

Professional life
In his professional life Van der Giessen was one of the owners and founder of the shipyard Van der Giessen de Noord.

Sources
 
 
 

1918 births
1993 deaths
People from Krimpen aan den IJssel
Dutch male sailors (sport)
Sailors at the 1952 Summer Olympics – 5.5 Metre
Olympic sailors of the Netherlands
Sportspeople from South Holland